Clemant is a coastal locality in the City of Townsville, Queensland, Australia.

History 
The locality was named and bounded on 27 July 1991.

Geography
The Coral Sea forms most of the north-eastern boundary.

Road infrastructure
The Bruce Highway runs along the south-western boundary.

References 

City of Townsville
Coastline of Queensland
Localities in Queensland